Song Xibin (born April 1963) is a former Chinese politician who spent his entire career in northeast China's Heilongjiang province. He was investigated by China's top anti-graft agency in January 2022. Previously he served as vice chairman of Heilongjiang People's Congress and president of Heilongjiang Federation of Trade Unions and before that, mayor of Harbin. He was a delegate to the 11th and 12th National People's Congress.

Biography
Song was born in Harbin, Heilongjiang, in April 1963, while his ancestral home in Penglai County, Shandong. In 1982, he was accepted to Harbin Normal University, majoring in mathematics. After graduation, he taught at Harbin No. 14 High School.

Song joined the Chinese Communist Party in June 1984, and got involved in politics in March 1986, when he was assigned to the local branch of the Communist Youth League of China. In November 2002, he eventually rose to become secretary of Heilongjiang Provincial Committee of the Communist Youth League of China, the top political position in the organization. In June 2005, he became deputy secretary-general of Heilongjiang Provincial People's Government, but having held the position for only four months. In November 2005, he was transferred to Daxing'anling Prefecture and appointed governor, concurrently serving as party secretary since February 2008. In February 2010, he was appointed director of Heilongjiang Provincial Development and Reform Commission, concurrently holding the party branch secretary position. In December 2011, he became vice mayor of the capital Harbin, rising to mayor in January 2012. In January 2018, he took office as vice chairman of Heilongjiang People's Congress, concurrently serving as president of Heilongjiang Federation of Trade Unions since August 2019.

Downfall
On 26 January 2022, he was put under investigation for alleged "serious violations of discipline and laws" by the Central Commission for Discipline Inspection (CCDI), the party's internal disciplinary body, and the National Supervisory Commission, the highest anti-corruption agency of China. On November 5, he has been arrested on suspicion of taking bribes as per a decision made by the Supreme People's Procuratorate.

References

1963 births
Living people
People from Harbin
Harbin Normal University alumni
Harbin Engineering University alumni
Central Party School of the Chinese Communist Party alumni
People's Republic of China politicians from Heilongjiang
Chinese Communist Party politicians from Heilongjiang
Mayors of Harbin
Delegates to the 11th National People's Congress
Delegates to the 12th National People's Congress